World Rally Radio was the official radio station of the FIA World Rally Championship, broadcast live on the Internet.

General
World Rally Radio followed the teams and drivers around all rounds of the championship. The station broadcast 24/7, with live coverage at each event. Content included the latest split times and live interviews with the drivers at the end of the stages. There was regular listener interaction  and competitions, such as the "Podium Predictor". The World Rally Radio team also produced pre-event videos and an audio podcast from each day of all WRC events. Service ended in 2018 after the introduction of WRC All Live.

Key Personnel
Chris Rawes, technical director
Mark Jones, production manager
Greg Strange, editorial director
Daniel Smith, Stage end reporter
Becs Williams, presenter
Colin Clark, stage-end reporter

See also
List of World Rally Championship broadcasters
WRC+

References

External links
 

World Rally Championship
Internet radio stations in the United Kingdom